Karayakup  is a village in Mersin Province, Turkey.

Geography

Karayakup  is a village in Erdemli district of Mersin Province. The population of the village was 650 as of 2019.

History

The area around the village was inhabited during the ancient and medieval ages. There are two castle ruins to the south of the village, Gökçam and Fanazlık. The village itself was founded four centuries ago by a Turkmen clan from Karaman. The village was named after the leader of the clan. During the Turkish War of Independence in 1920s, almost all village men were enlisted and a woman named Elif was appointed as the muhtar (village head) of the village to be the first example of female muhtar around. In 1989 a neighbourhood of the village named Sinap was issued from Karayakup.

Economy

The main economic activity is farming. Various vegetables and fruits are produced. Tomato, cucumber, olive and grapes are among the main crops. Sheep breeding and beehiving are other activities.

References

Villages in Erdemli District